An atom interferometer is an interferometer which uses the wave character of atoms.  Similar to optical interferometers, atom interferometers measure the difference in phase between atomic matter waves along different paths.   Atom interferometers have many uses in fundamental physics including measurements of the gravitational constant, the fine-structure constant, the universality of free fall, and have been proposed as a method to detect gravitational waves.  They also have applied uses as accelerometers, rotation sensors, and gravity gradiometers.

Overview

Interferometry inherently depends on the wave nature of the object. As pointed out by de Broglie in his PhD thesis, particles, including atoms, can behave like waves (the so-called wave–particle duality, according to the general framework of quantum mechanics). More and more high precision experiments now employ atom interferometers due to their short de Broglie wavelength. Some experiments are now even using molecules to obtain even shorter de Broglie wavelengths and to search for the limits of quantum mechanics. In many experiments with atoms, the roles of matter and light are reversed compared to the laser based interferometers, i.e. the beam splitter and mirrors are lasers while the source instead emits matter waves (the atoms).

Interferometer types

While the use of atoms offers easy access to higher frequencies (and thus accuracies) than light, atoms are affected much more strongly by gravity. In some apparatuses, the atoms are ejected upwards and the interferometry takes place while the atoms are in flight, or while falling in free flight. In other experiments gravitational effects by free acceleration are not negated; additional forces are used to compensate for gravity. While these guided systems in principle can provide arbitrary amounts of measurement time, their quantum coherence is still under discussion. Recent theoretical studies indicate that coherence is indeed preserved in the guided systems, but this has yet to be experimentally confirmed.

The early atom interferometers deployed slits or wires for the beam splitters and mirrors. Later systems, especially the guided ones, used light forces for splitting and reflecting of
the matter wave.

Examples

History
The separation of matter wave packets from complete atoms was first observed by Esterman and Stern in 1930, when a Na beam was diffracted off a surface of NaCl.  The first modern atom interferometer reported was a Young's-type double-slit experiment with metastable helium atoms and a microfabricated double slit by Carnal and Mlynek in 1991, and an interferometer using three microfabricated diffraction gratings and Na atoms in the group around David E. Pritchard at MIT. Shortly afterwards, an optical version of a  Ramsey spectrometer typically used in atomic clocks was recognized also as an atom interferometer at the PTB in Braunschweig, Germany. The largest physical separation between the partial wave packets of atoms was achieved using laser cooling techniques and stimulated Raman transitions by S. Chu and coworkers in Stanford. More recently atom interferometers have begun moving out of laboratory conditions and have begun to address a variety of applications in real word environments.

Inertial navigation
The first team to make a working model, Pritchard's, was propelled by D.W. Keith. After achieving success, Keith chose to leave atomic physics, in part because one of the most obvious applications for atom interferometry was in highly accurate gyroscopes for submarines carrying ballistic missiles. AIGs (atomic interferometer gyroscopes) and ASGs (atomic spin gyroscopes) use atomic interferometer to sense rotation or in the latter case, uses atomic spin to sense rotation with both having compact size, high precision, and the possibility of being made on a chip-scale. "AI gyros" may compete, along with ASGs, with the established ring laser gyroscope, fiber optic gyroscope and hemispherical resonator gyroscope in future inertial guidance applications.

See also
Electron interferometer
Ramsey interferometry

References

External links

 Overview of the atom–light interaction
P. R. Berman [Editor], Atom Interferometry. Academic Press (1997). Detailed overview of atom interferometers at that time (good introductions and theory).
Stedman Review of the Sagnac Effect

Interferometers
Articles containing video clips